Solar Splash is an intercollegiate solar/electric boat competition dedicated to showing the feasibility of solar energy.

An annual collegiate solar boating competition started in 1994. The 2007 contest was hosted by the City of Fayetteville, Arkansas, and the University of Arkansas College of Engineering. It took place June 13–17.

See also
 Formula E

External links
Solar Splash Official Website.

References

Motorboat races
Solar-powered vehicles
Recurring sporting events established in 1994
Photovoltaics
Electric boats